Pelsall railway station is a disused railway station that served the villages of Pelsall and Shelfield in the Metropolitan Borough of Walsall, West Midlands, England. It was on the South Staffordshire Line between Walsall and Lichfield.

History

It was opened in 1849. It closed as part of the Beeching Axe in 1965. The station was built and served by the South Staffordshire Railway, which later became London, Midland and Scottish Railway (through amalgamation of the London and North Western Railway).

The station also had a small single track leave after the station to serve the Atlas Brickworks and Leighswood Colliery until the 1930s when Leighswood Colliery closed but continued to serve Atlas Brickworks until 1964 when the small branch line closed.

The station closed in 1964 as part of the Beeching Cuts although the line that passed through the station remained open until 1984. It is preserved in case the railway line between Walsall and Lichfield reopens.

Station site today
The trackbed through the former station site is now part of a footpath used by cyclists and dog walkers. In 2016, the bridge that carried the line to and from Walsall over Vicarage Road had a green fenced erected across both sides of the edges due to youths throwing stones and other rubbish at passing cars and people. 
Nothing remains of the station apart from parts of fencing on the Walsall platform and the former station masters house on Station Road to the immediate north.

References

Bring Back our railway including a Pelsall Station!

Disused railway stations in Walsall
Railway stations in Great Britain opened in 1849
Railway stations in Great Britain closed in 1965
Beeching closures in England
1849 establishments in England
1965 disestablishments in England
Former London and North Western Railway stations